The following is a list of sovereign states that have Malay as an official language.

Sovereign states

References